Richard Smith "Bill" Hudson (July 30, 1940 – March 2, 2016) was an American football player who was a starting offensive lineman at Memphis State University for four years. In 1961, he was a second-round draft pick by the American Football League's San Diego Chargers. 

Traded to the AFL's Buffalo Bills in 1963, he was a part of the 1964 and 1965 AFL Championship teams.   Hudson was an AFL Eastern Division All-Star in 1965 and in 1970 was named to the Buffalo Bills Team of the 1960s Decade.

Retiring from pro football, he returned to Paris, Tennessee and served as assistant and head coach of the Henry County High School Patriots football team and vice principal of the high school.

See also
 List of American Football League players

References

1940 births
2016 deaths
American football offensive tackles
American Football League players
Buffalo Bills players
Memphis Tigers football players
San Diego Chargers players
High school football coaches in Tennessee
American Football League All-Star players
Sportspeople from Memphis, Tennessee
People from Paris, Tennessee
Players of American football from Memphis, Tennessee